
Gmina Końskie is an urban-rural gmina (administrative district) in Końskie County, Świętokrzyskie Voivodeship, in central Poland.

Villages
Apart from the town of Końskie, Gmina Końskie contains the villages and settlements of Baczyna, Barycz, Bedlenko, Bedlno, Brody, Chełb, Czerwony Most, Czysta, Drutarnia, Dyszów, Fidor, Gabrielnia, Gatniki, Głupiów, Górny Młyn, Grabków, Gracuch, Izabelów, Jeżów, Koczwara, Kopaniny, Kornica, Małachów, Młynek Nieświński, Modliszewice, Nałęczów, Niebo, Nieświń, Nowe Sierosławice, Nowy Dziebałtów, Nowy Kazanów, Nowy Sokołów, Paruchy, Piekło, Piła, Pomorzany, Pomyków, Poraj, Proćwin, Przybyszowy, Radomek, Rogów, Sielpia Wielka, Sierosławice, Stadnicka Wola, Stara Kuźnica, Stary Dziebałtów, Stary Kazanów, Stary Sokołów, Sworzyce, Szabelnia, Trzemoszna, Wąsosz and Wincentów.

Neighbouring gminas
Gmina Końskie is bordered by the gminas of Białaczów, Gowarczów, Przysucha, Radoszyce, Ruda Maleniecka, Smyków, Stąporków and Żarnów.

References
Polish official population figures 2006

Konskie
Końskie County